Sumy Airport  is a state international airport located in Sumy, Ukraine. It has become international since 8 December 2006. The airport is capable of accepting such aircraft as the Tu-134 (with limitations), An-24, Yak-40, and aircraft of lower classes round-the-clock. The capacity of the airport terminal is 100 passengers per hour. As of August 2008, there are no flights scheduled from the capital Kyiv. The airport hosts car shows.

See also
 List of airports in Ukraine
 List of the busiest airports in Ukraine

External links 
 ASN Accident history for UKHS

Airports in Ukraine